The World Junior Alpine Skiing Championships 2018 were the 37th World Junior Alpine Skiing Championships, held between 30 January and 8 February 2018 in Davos, Switzerland.

Schedule
Eleven events will be held.

Medal winners

Men's events

Ladies events

Team event

Medal table

References

External links
Official website
World Junior Alpine Skiing Championships 2018 results at fis-ski.com

World Junior Alpine Skiing Championships
2018 in alpine skiing
Alpine skiing competitions in Switzerland
2018 in Swiss sport
Alpine skiing
January 2018 sports events in Switzerland
February 2018 sports events in Switzerland